5-a-side football at the 2010 Asian Para Games were held in Aoti Hockey Field from December 13 to December 18. There was 1 gold medals in this sport.

Medalists

Result

Group stage

Bronze-medal match

Gold-medal match

References

Football 5-a-side results

2010
Para Games
2010 Asian Para Games events
Football 5
2010